Keith Diamond (born Vincent Keith Ford Jr. on March 26, 1962) is an American former actor. He is especially known for his roles as Agent J on Men In Black: The Series and as recurring character Greg Clemens on The Drew Carey Show.

Career
Over his career, Diamond has appeared in guest spots on numerous television series, including The Cosby Show, Charmed, Martin, ER, and LAX. He also guest-starred in Criminal Minds in the episode, "Plain Sight" as Detective Cornelius Martin who aids the BAU in capturing a serial rapist/murderer named the '"Tommy Killer".

Filmography

External links

1962 births
Living people
African-American male actors
American male film actors
American male television actors
American male voice actors
People from Queens, New York
21st-century African-American people
20th-century African-American people